William Young (died 25 September 1986) was the skip of the Scottish teams at the 1959 and 1962 Scotch Cups, the world men's curling championship at the time. He and the team of third John Pearson, second Sandy Anderson, and lead Bobby Young curled out of the Airth, Bruce Castle, and Dunmore Curling Club in Falkirk, Scotland.

He is not to be confused with another Willie Young, a curler from Kinross.

Young was a farmer from Bridgend near Airth. He had an unorthodox curling delivery, as he slid with his right foot while also throwing from his right hand. In addition to his 2 Scotch Cup appearances, he also won six "Worlds Curling Championships" (now known as the Edinburgh International).

References

External links
 
 

Sportspeople from Falkirk (council area)
Scottish male curlers
Scottish curling champions
1986 deaths
Year of birth missing